Eumicrotremus is a genus of lumpfishes native to the northern oceans. The name for this genus comes from the Greek roots eu meaning "good", mikros meaning "small" or "little", and trema meaning "hole".

Taxonomy
Eumicrotremus was first proposed as a genus in 1862 by the American biologist Theodore Gill with Fabricius’s Cyclopterus spinosus as its type species. The 5th edition of Fishes of the World does not recognize subfamilies within the Cyclopteridae, however, other authorities place this genus in the subfamily Eumicrotreminae.

Species
There are currently 18 recognized species in this genus:
 Eumicrotremus andriashevi Perminov, 1936  
 E. a. aculeatus Voskoboinikova & Nazarkin, 2015 (Andriashev's spicular-spiny pimpled lumpsucker) 
 E. a. andriashevi Perminov, 1936  (Andriashev's spiny pimpled lumpsucker)
 Eumicrotremus asperrimus (S. Tanaka (I), 1912)
 Eumicrotremus awae (Jordan & Snyder, 1902) 
 Eumicrotremus barbatus (Lindberg & Legeza 1955)
 Eumicrotremus derjugini Popov, 1926 (Leather-fin lumpsucker)
 Eumicrotremus fedorovi (Mandritsa, 1991) (Fedorov's lumpsucker)
 Eumicrotremus gyrinops (Garman, 1892)
 Eumicrotremus jindoensis S. J. Lee, J.-K. Kim, Y. Kai, S. Ikeguchi, & T. Nakabo, 2017 
 Eumicrotremus orbis (Günther, 1861) (Pacific spiny lumpsucker)
 Eumicrotremus pacificus P. Y. Schmidt, 1904
 Eumicrotremus phrynoides C. H. Gilbert & Burke, 1912 (Toad lumpsucker)
 Eumicrotremus schmidti Lindberg & Legeza, 1955
 Eumicrotremus spinosus (J. C. Fabricius, 1776) (Atlantic spiny lumpsucker)
 Eumicrotremus taranetzi Perminov, 1936
 Eumicrotremus tartaricus Lindberg & Legeza, 1955
 Eumicrotremus terraenovae G. S. Myers & J. E. Böhlke, 1950
 Eumicrotremus tokranovi Voskoboinikova, 2015 (Tokranov's lumpsucker)
 Eumicrotremus uenoi S. J. Lee, J.-K. Kim, Y. Kai, S. Ikeguchi, & T. Nakabo, 2017

References

 
Cyclopteridae
Articles containing video clips
Marine fish genera
Scorpaeniformes genera
Taxa named by Theodore Gill